Speed skating at the 2011 Asian Winter Games was held at Alau Ice Palace in Astana, Kazakhstan. The twelve events were scheduled for January 31 – February 6, 2011.

Schedule

Medalists

Men

Women

Medal table

Participating nations
A total of 61 athletes from 7 nations competed in speed skating at the 2011 Asian Winter Games:

References

 speedskatingresults.com

 
Asian Winter Games
2011 Asian Winter Games events
2011
Asian Winter Games, 2011